The Alliance of Girls' Schools Australasia (abbreviated as AGSA) is a non-profit organisation that promotes the education of girls in single-sex girls' schools, and promotes the image of, and support the development of, girls' schools in Australasia.

The Alliance's first annual general meeting was held in May 1996, where membership of the Alliance was extended to all girls' schools in Australia and New Zealand whether independent, government or Catholic. The Alliance was incorporated 18 August 1997.

The alliance currently accepts membership from any school in Australia, Hong Kong, Japan, New Zealand, the Philippines, Singapore, South Africa and Zimbabwe which educates girls only.

It is affiliated with the Girls' Schools Association (GSA, UK) and the National Coalition of Girls' Schools (NCGS, US).

Membership
, the Alliance comprised 184 schools:

 Former members
 Raffles Girls' School (Secondary) (Singapore)

References

External links
http://www.agsa.org.au/

 
Australian schools associations
Girls' schools in Australia
Girls' schools in New Zealand